Bartkowicz is a Polish surname. Notable people with this surname include:

 Chris Bartkowicz, American health activist
 Jane Bartkowicz (born 1949), American tennis player

See also
 

Polish-language surnames